Kellie Jones (born 1959) is an American art historian and curator. She is a Professor in Art History and Archaeology in African American Studies at Columbia University. She won a MacArthur Fellowship in 2016.

Biography
Jones is the daughter of poets Hettie Jones and Amiri Baraka. Jones graduated from Amherst College in 1981.  She was awarded a Ph.D. by Yale University in 1999.

Her research interests include African Diaspora and African American artists, Latin American and Latino/a artists, and problems in contemporary art and museum theory. Jones has been published in journals such as NKA, Artforum, Flash Art, Atlantica, and Third Text. Jones has worked as a curator for over three decades.

Jones has a half-brother, Newark, New Jersey, mayor Ras Baraka, and a half-sister, Dominique di Prima, from Amiri's relationship with di Prima's mother.

Awards and honors 
 2005: David C. Driskell Prize. 
 2012: Artist-in-Residence at the McColl Center for Art + Innovation
 2013: Andy Warhol Foundation Art Writers Grant.
 2013: Terra Foundation Fellow.
 2016: MacArthur Fellows Program award.
2018: College Art Association Award for Excellence in Diversity.
 2019: American Academy of Arts and Sciences Fellow.

Curated exhibits 
Curated and co-curated exhibits:

Basquiat. New York: Brooklyn Museum, March 11, 2005 through June 5, 2005. Co-curators include Marc Mayer, Fred Hoffman, Kellie Jones, and Franklin Sirmans.
Energy / Experimentation: Black Artists and Abstraction, 1964-1980. New York: The Studio Museum in Harlem, 2006.
Now Dig This! Art and Black Los Angeles, 1960–1980. Los Angeles: Hammer Museum, October 2, 2011 – January 8, 2012; MOMA PS1 in Long Island City, New York, from October 21, 2012 – March 11, 2013; and at the Williams College Museum of Art in Williamstown, MA, from July 20-December 1, 2013.
 Witness: Art and Civil Rights in the Sixties. New York: Brooklyn Museum, March 7–July 13, 2014. Co-curated by Teresa A. Carbone and Kellie Jones.

Books 
 Jones, Kellie (2002). Lorna Simpson. London: Phaidon Press. 
 Jones, Kellie (2011). EyeMinded: Living And Writing Contemporary Art. Durham: Duke University Press. 
 Jones, Kellie (2011). Now Dig This!: Art & Black Los Angeles, 1960-1980. Los Angeles: Hammer Museum.  
 Jones, Kellie (2017). South of Pico: African American Artists in Los Angeles in the 1960s and 1970s. Durham: Duke University Press.

References

External links
Kellie Jones' official website
Kellie Jones, Columbia University Department of Art History & Archaeology

1959 births
Living people
Columbia University faculty
MacArthur Fellows
Women art historians
Jewish American academics
Jewish American writers
American art historians
African-American Jews
Amherst College alumni
Yale University alumni
American art curators
21st-century American Jews
American women curators